Joseph Thomas Cunningham (1859–1935) was a British marine biologist and zoologist known for his experiments on flatfish and his writings on neo-Lamarckism.

Career

Cunningham worked at the London Hospital Medical College. He completed his science scholarship at Balliol College, Oxford. Cunningham was a neo-Lamarckian. In his book Hormones and Heredity (1921) he proposed that the mechanism for the inheritance of acquired characteristics were hormones. He termed this "chemical Lamarckism".

According to science historian Peter J. Bowler the idea held by Cunningham that hormones transferred from one generation to the next independent of the germ plasm was seen at the time by neo-Lamarckians as a plausible hypothesis, however "its advocates were unable to get beyond the stage of providing indirect evidence for the effect they postulated."

Experiments
In a series of experiments (in 1891, 1893 and 1895) on the action of light on the coloration of flatfish, Cunningham directed light upon the lower sides of flatfishes by means of a glass-bottomed tank placed over a mirror. He discovered that light causes the production of pigments on the lower sides of flatfishes, and gave his results a Lamarckian interpretation. Other scientists interpreted his results differently. George Romanes wrote approvingly of Cunningham's interpretation, but the geneticist William Bateson was not convinced that the cause of the increase in pigmentation was from the illumination. Thomas Hunt Morgan criticized the experiments and did not believe the results were evidence for Lamarckism.

Opposition to sexual selection
Cunningham challenged the concept of sexual selection. His book Sexual Dimorphism in the Animal Kingdom (1900) attempted to explain secondary sexual characters by Lamarckian principles. The chemist Raphael Meldola noted in a review for Nature that "although many of us may arrive at the conclusion that Mr. Cunningham has not succeeded in establishing his case, it will be generally admitted that he has discussed the problem, on the whole, in a more or less scientific spirit."

He translated Theodor Eimer's Die Enstehung der Arten (1888) into English.

Publications

Charles Darwin: Naturalist (1886)
Sexual Dimorphism in the Animal Kingdom: A Theory of the Evolution of Secondary Sexual Characters (1900)
The Preservation of Fishing Nets (1902)
Hormones and Heredity (1921)
Modern Biology: A Review of the Principal Phenomena of Animal Life in Relation to Modern Concepts and Theories (1928)

References

 
  

1859 births
1935 deaths
British marine biologists
British zoologists
Charles Darwin biographers
Lamarckism